Three-time defending champions David Wagner and Nick Taylor won the quad doubles wheelchair tennis title at the 2011 US Open following the withdrawal of Peter Norfolk and Noam Gershony from the final.

Main draw

Final

References
 Main Draw

Wheelchair Quad Doubles
U.S. Open, 2011 Wheelchair Quad Doubles